Horace Everett (July 17, 1779 – January 30, 1851) was an American politician. He served as a United States representative from Vermont.

Biography
Everett was born in Foxboro, Massachusetts. His father was John Everett; his mother was Melatiah (Metcalf) Ware. In 1797 he graduated from Brown University in Providence, Rhode Island. He studied law and was  admitted to the bar in 1801. He began the practice of law in Windsor, Vermont.

He served as State's Attorney for Windsor County, Vermont, from 1813 until 1818. He was a member of the Vermont House of Representatives in 1819, 1820, 1822, 1824, and again in 1834.
He was a delegate to the State constitutional convention in 1828.

Everett was elected as an Anti-Jacksonian candidate to the 21st United States Congress, 22nd United States Congress, 23rd United States Congress and the 24th United States Congress. He was elected as a Whig to the 25th United States Congress, 26th United States Congress and 27th United States Congress. He served in Congress from March 4, 1829, until March 3, 1843.

Family life
Everett married Mary Leverett on October 31, 1811, and had one son named Horace Everett.

He was a descendant of Richard Everett, founder of both Springfield, Massachusetts, and Dedham, Massachusetts. He was the first cousin of Edward Everett, U.S. Representative, U.S. Senator and the 15th Governor of Massachusetts.

Death
Everett died on January 30, 1851, in Windsor, Vermont. He is interred at the Old South Church Cemetery in Windsor.

References

Further reading
Everett, Edward Franklin. Descendants of Richard Everett of Dedham, Massachusetts. Boston: 1902, pp. 60, 108-10

External links
 
 Biographical Directory of the United States Congress
 
 govtrack.us: Rep. Horace Everett
 The Political Graveyard: Everett, Horace (1779–1851)
 Old South Cemetery

1779 births
1851 deaths
People from Foxborough, Massachusetts
American people of English descent
Vermont Democratic-Republicans
Vermont National Republicans
National Republican Party members of the United States House of Representatives from Vermont
Whig Party members of the United States House of Representatives from Vermont
Deans of the United States House of Representatives
People from Windsor, Vermont
Members of the Vermont House of Representatives
State's attorneys in Vermont
Vermont lawyers
Brown University alumni
Burials in Vermont
19th-century American lawyers